7 is the second studio album from Norwegian futurepop group Apoptygma Berzerk. The album was released in 1996 following frontman Stephan Groth's work on several side projects. It has been remastered and re-released in 2003, 2008 and 2014 (on cassette) respectively. While each remaster included bonus songs, the samples of Carl Orff's "O Fortuna" present on "Love Never Dies – Part 1" were replaced with a choir keyboard patch playing an entirely different melody, due to copyright issues over the original pressings by Tatra and Metropolis Records. The album peaked at #18 on the CMJ RPM Charts in the U.S.

Track listing

References

1996 albums
Apoptygma Berzerk albums